Dilemma is a 1962 British crime thriller directed by Peter Maxwell and starring Peter Halliday and Ingrid Hafner.

Plot
Harry returns home from work on the eve of his second wedding anniversary to be told by his next door neighbour that a scream came from his house minutes earlier. Inside, he finds a strange man dying in the bathroom and his wife missing.

Cast
Peter Halliday as Harry Barnes
Ingrid Hafner as Jean Barnes
Patricia Burke as Edna Jones
Joan Heath as Mrs. Barnes
Patrick Jordan as Inspector Murray
Barbara Lott as Nun
Arthur Hewlett as Piano Tuner
Alan Rolfe as Arthur Jones
Robert Dean as Doctor

References

External links
Film page at BFI

1962 films
1960s crime thriller films
British black-and-white films
Films with screenplays by Pip and Jane Baker
1960s English-language films
Films directed by Peter Maxwell